Take Me In may refer to:
 "Take Me In" (Powderfinger song), 1997
 "Take Me In" (Bonnie Pink song), 2001
 "Take Me In", a song by Kutless from the album Strong Tower